Veretye is a rural locality (a village) in Prigorodnoye Rural Settlement, Sokolsky District, Vologda Oblast, Russia. The population was 13 as of 2002.

Geography 
Veretye is located 15 km southeast of Sokol (the district's administrative centre) by road. Kuznetsovo is the nearest rural locality.

References 

Rural localities in Sokolsky District, Vologda Oblast